Nepal Janata Party is a political party in Nepal. The party registered with the Election Commission of Nepal ahead of the 2008 Constituent Assembly election.

References

Political parties in Nepal